The Austro-Slovene conflict in Carinthia was a military engagement that ensued in the aftermath of World War I between forces loyal to the State of Slovenes, Croats and Serbs and later the Kingdom of Serbs, Croats and Slovenes, and forces loyal to the Republic of German-Austria. The main theater of the conflict was the linguistically mixed region in southeastern Carinthia. The conflict was settled by the Treaty of Saint-Germain in 1919, which stipulated that the territorial dispute be resolved by a plebiscite.

Many Slovene-speaking people were in favor of joining the newly formed Kingdom of Serbs, Croats and Slovenes (later Yugoslavia), while the German speaking people and also a large part of Slovenes were loyal to the newly proclaimed Republic of German Austria (Deutsch-Österreich). The disputed territory was earlier on a part of the Duchy of Carinthia within the Holy Roman Empire from year 976, and had belonged to the Habsburg monarchy since year 1335. At the centre of conflict was the position of the border that separated the two new states.

Background
Slovene-speaking regions were integrated into several Austrian states throughout much of the 2nd millennium. The idea of South Slavic–speaking territories creating a new state of their own had been one of the key issues debated among Slovene intelligentsia throughout the second part of the 19th century, especially in the aftermath of the spring of nations. As a consequence of Austro-Hungarian invasion of the Kingdom of Serbia the Yugoslav committee was formed, with its goal being the unification of South Slavic lands known as Yugoslavia. In 1916 the Serbian parliament in exile voted in favour of creating a Kingdom of Yugoslavia as a plan of post-world war governance of the Balkan peninsula.

Creation of the State of Slovenes, Croats and Serbs
As a consequence of the World War, the Austro-Hungarian Empire began to dissolve even before the war officially ended. In the period between 5–8 October 1918 a pro-Yugoslav National Council of Slovenes, Croats and Serbs took control over the regional administration in Zagreb. On 29 October the National Council declared the formation of a Yugoslav state, following a rejection of a plan of greater autonomy within Austria-Hungary.

The Entente powers did not recognise the newly found state before it merged with the Kingdom of Serbia three days later, in an effort to create a stable and recognised country of all South Slavs, as well as discouraging Italy from conquering Slav-settled territory not allocated as war reparations to Italy in Treaty of London.

Territorial claims 
No formal border was yet recognised between the newly created entities, with both sides claiming that they are in control of the area along the ethnically mixed settlements. The National Government in Ljubljana did not pay any particular attention to the border issue, as it was planning on gaining much area through negotiations at the peace conference.

Escalation

Mobilization 
The National Council for Styria (Slovene: Narodni svet za Štajersko) gave permission to take control of the military branch in Maribor to Rudolf Maister, a veteran of the World War and a former officer of Austria-Hungary. He also gained the rank of a General, and was given authority over all military forces located in Styria under control of the Kingdom of SHS. On 31 October, Rudolf Maister announced his disagreement with the municipal declaration of Maribor in front of an audience of  Lieutenant Colonel Anton Holik and his officers at the Melj military barracks of the 26th infantry regiment. On 9 November Maister announced full mobilization of Lower Styria, which was disagreed with by both, the German-Austrian government and authorities in Ljubljana. The mobilization decree was successful as the armed forces grew to about 4,000 fighters, and establishing a new infantry regiment in Maribor by 21 November.

Military movements begin 
First Lieutenant Franjo Malgaj and his unit entered Carinthia on 6 November. Captain Alfred Lavrič's unit was designated to be in charge of capturing Carinthia, and began taking control of the territory on 13 November, when his units entered the Jaun Valley (German: Jauntal, Slovene: Podjuna) and Ferlach (Slovene: Borovlje). The Loibl Pass (German: Loiblpass, Slovene: prelaz Ljubelj) was captured the following day.

On 23 November Maister's fighters began to seize control of guard posts throughout the Maribor region by disarming the local guardsmen controlled by the Maribor municipality. Captain Rudolf Knez entered Sittersdorf (Žitara vas) and settled his units there. From 27 November onward, the Slovene fighters under direct command of Maister, took control of Spielfeld (Špilje), Bad Radkersburg (Radgona), Mureck (Cmurek), Leutschach (Lučane), Marenberg (Radlje ob Dravi), and Muta (Hohenmauthen), while the units from Celje (Cilli) under command of Franjo Malgaj took control of the Meža Valley (Mießtal), Bleiburg (Pliberk), where Serb volunteers returning from the Eastern front of World War I also joined Malgaj's unit. All the areas captured were agreed upon by General Rudolf Passy of Carinthia and General Maister on 27 November. The agreement included allowance to take control of all Slovene-majority settlements, but remained unsupported and criticized by Styrian, Carinthian, German-Austrian authorities, as well as the National council in Ljubljana. Units from Ljubljana took control of Dravograd (Unterdrauburg), Lavamünd (Labot) and Sankt Paul (Šentpavel). The capture of Völkermarkt (Velikovec) on 30 November sparked much criticism, as it allegedly wasn't included in the demarcation line plans.

Armed conflicts 

First armed clashes already occurred under command of Malgaj during the attack on Bleiburg, but it was not until the battle in Lučane when violent confrontations became apparent. Lučane was the site of a first major clash between the two factions on 14 January 1919. Following minor fights between the two militias, a larger battle occurred on 4 February near Radgona. Plans were set by Maister to attack and capture Klagenfurt (Celovec) but were abandoned following negotiations. On 13 February a peace treaty was signed by both parties.

On Sunday, 27 January 1919, Maister's forces clashed with German protesters, resulting in several civilian deaths.

Graz-Ljubljana Protocol 
With the occupation of southeastern Carinthia by Yugoslav troops, and the confrontation evolving into armed clashes, the provisional Carinthian government under Governor Arthur Lemisch decided to lead off the armed struggle in order to preserve the southern Carinthian border on the Karawanks. Bitter fighting of paramilitary groups around Arnoldstein and Ferlach alarmed the Entente powers. They arbitrated a ceasefire, whereafter a nine-day U.S. Army commission under Lt. Col. Sherman Miles scouted the disputed region between river and mountains in January and February 1919 and made the crucial recommendation that the Karawanks frontier should be retained, thus opening the possibility of a plebiscite. Yugoslav representatives urged for a border on the Drava; American delegates however spoke in favor of preserving the unity of the Klagenfurt Basin and convinced the British and French delegations to support their plan of plebiscite for the entire Klagenfurt region.

Yugoslav offensive and Austrian counter-offensive 
On 29 April, Yugoslav troops breached ceasefire agreement after months of relative peace. Armed clashes occurred throughout the region, with noticeable territorial gains achieved by Kingdom of Serbs, Croats and Slovenes. The Yugoslav troops experienced much resistance in the following days, as Austrian troops already made effective counter-offensive actions. The situation for Slovenes worsened, and on 2 May Carinthian units had already taken control of Völkermarkt. Two days later Austrian counter-offensive reached the Gallizien (Slovene: Galicija)-Apače (German: Abstall)-Sankt Margareten im Rosental (Šmarjeta) line. After two days of fierce fighting the German-Austrian units successfully conquered the line and in process destroyed the 3rd infantry battalion from Ljubljana.

The remaining Slovene units continued to retreat back into lower Styria, while almost all of the Carinthian area that was gained during the winter clashes was lost to the advancing Austrian units. The last to fall was Dravograd (Unterdrauburg) before the Royal Yugoslav Army's 36th infantry regiment under control of Lt.Col. Vladimir Uzorinac managed to hold ground in Guštanj (Gutenstein) and therefore stop the counter-offensive. General Maister sent two units of his Maribor infantry regiment to aid the troops holding ground near Slovenj Gradec (Windischgraz). Officer Malgaj was killed on 6 May, one of the key leaders of the Slovene fighters in Carinthia.

After a military defeat in the offensive initiated in April, authorities in Ljubljana mobilised all their assets and drafted regiments from Serbia to regain lost territory. On 26 May a new offensive was authorised which lasted throughout May and until 6 June, during which they managed to capture much of the Klagenfurt region to as north as Maria Saal (Gospa Sveta). The offensive was considered a military success.

Aftermath 

The Paris peace conference turned the tide, when an order was given to the Yugoslavs to completely retreat from the northern B zone of the Klagenfurt Basin area in a time frame set to end on 31 July, at the latest, to enable the commission to carry out the planned plebiscite.

The Treaty of Saint-Germain with the Republic of Austria, signed on 10 September 1919, should have determined the Austrian-Yugoslav border. It ascertained that some small parts of Carinthia, the Meža Valley with the town of Dravograd and the Jezersko municipal area, would be incorporated into the new Kingdom of Serbs, Croats and Slovenes while the fate of wider southeastern Carinthia area down to the Klagenfurt Basin was to be determined by a plebiscite.

The outcome of the plebiscite held on 10 October 1920, was 22,025 votes (59.1% of the total cast) for adhesion to Austria and 15,279 (40.9%) for annexation by the Kingdom of the Serbs, Croats, and Slovenes.

While a majority in the remote Alpine villages on the slopes of the Karawanks voted for Yugoslavia, the inhabitants of the densely-settled Klagenfurt Basin were motivated by their evolved social, cultural and economic ties to the central Carinthian region.

The region was placed under Austrian administration on 18 November 1920 and declared part of the sovereign Austrian Republic on 22 November. Until today, 10 October is a public holiday in the State of Carinthia.

The plebiscite ultimately determined the border between Austria and the Kingdom of Serbs, Croats, and Slovenes. The border remained unchanged after World War II, even as the Kingdom of Yugoslavia gave way to Josip Broz Tito's Socialist Federal Republic of Yugoslavia, but at the end of the war, Yugoslav Partisans again briefly occupied the area, including the capital city of Klagenfurt. Since the disintegration of Yugoslavia, the border separates Austria and Slovenia.

References

Political history of Slovenia
1918 in Austria-Hungary
1918 in Yugoslavia
1919 in Yugoslavia
History of the Slovenes
Conflicts in 1918
Conflicts in 1919
Aftermath of World War I in Austria
Aftermath of World War I in Yugoslavia
History of Carinthia (region)
Wars involving Yugoslavia